Ski jumping at the 1968 Winter Olympics consisted of two events held from 11 to 18 February, with the large hill event taking place at Saint-Nizier-du-Moucherotte, and the normal hill event at Autrans.

Medal summary

Medal table

Czechoslovakia led the medal table with two, one gold. The gold medal won by Vladimir Belussov in the large hill event was the only medal in ski jumping ever won by the Soviet Union.

Events

Participating NOCs
Seventeen nations participated in ski jumping at the Grenoble Games.

References

 
1968 Winter Olympics events
1968
1968 in ski jumping
Ski jumping competitions in France